Dark•Matter is a science fiction / conspiracy theory campaign setting that was originally published in December 1999 by Wizards of the Coast as the second campaign setting for the Alternity role-playing game. It was written by Wolfgang Baur and Monte Cook. It was later converted to d20 Modern rules and published as a stand-alone book in 2006.

Development
Wolfgang Baur did considerable research into the occult, UFO, and government conspiracy theories in preparation for writing the Dark•Matter game.

Background
In the setting, the Hoffmann Institute is an organization which investigates strange creatures and phenomena. The players take on the roles of members of this organization, and delve into the supernatural and mysterious. The premise of the game is that nearly every strange or supernatural story ever widely told is true, but a web of conspiracies and secret organizations hide this truth from the average person.

This premise was not unique to Dark•Matter, having first been used as the basis for a role-playing game in Bureau 13.

Contents
The original book was hardbound with 288 pages illustrated in color. It was divided into chapters covering the background of the Dark•Matter setting to include an introduction to the Hoffmann Institute, hero creation, magic and psionics, history of the setting, the Illuminati, and places of interest. Highlights include:

 The true and secret history of Earth.
 Detailed descriptions of 13 powerful conspiracies and secret societies pulling the strings of power, plus nearly 20 more minor organizations.
 Dozens of mysterious sites and hidden strongholds, from the ancient enigma of the Pyramids to the rotten façade of Washington, D.C.
 New skills and careers for heroes, including options for advanced characters.
 New rules for using FX (magic) in your Alternity game, including 45 new Arcane Magic and Faith FX spells.
 Nearly two dozen strange creatures.
 Gamemaster tips and tricks for running paranormal- and conspiracy-based games.
 Raw Recruits, an introductory adventure.
 Alternity Fast-Play Rules.

Accessories and novels
There were four accessories produced for the setting. Three of them were published in perfect bound paperback format and one was published as an electronic PDF file. There were also various articles published in Dungeon magazine, Amazing Stories, and Dragon magazine.

The Dark•Matter Arms and Equipment Guide provided a more detailed list of equipment appropriate to the setting.

The Xenoforms Book provided many more supernatural and alien creatures from myth and folklore to add to a campaign.

The Killing Jar was the first adventure published after those provided in the main rulebook.

The final book, which was provided as an electronic PDF, is The Final Church. It is a combination sourcebook and adventure. It provides information on the organization known as The Final Church and pits the characters against them.

There were five novels written for the setting although only four of them actually saw print. The fifth was offered as an electronic PDF file for a short period of time. In order the books were:

 In Hollow Houses, by Gary A. Braunbeck
 If Whispers Call, by Don Bassingthwaite
 In Fluid Silence, by G. W. Tirpa
 Of Aged Angels, by Monte Cook
 By Dust Consumed, by Don Bassingthwaite (only available for a short period of time as a PDF file)

d20 Modern system
Some of the Dark•Matter material has since been incorporated into the d20 Modern role-playing game and its d20 Menace Manual supplement.

Dark•Matter was first converted into a d20 Modern campaign in Dungeon #108/Polyhedron #163 as Dark•Matter: Shades of Grey. In September 2006, Dark•Matter was officially made into a d20 Modern campaign setting with the publication of d20 Dark•Matter.

Reception
In 2000, Dark•Matter won the Origins Awards for Best Graphic Presentation of a Roleplaying Game, Adventure, or Supplement of 1999.

In a review in the February 2000 issue of InQuest Gamer, Dan Joyce stated that Dark•Matter is "one of the best campaign settings" ever published by Wizards of the Coast and its subsidiary TSR, Inc.

Reviews
Backstab #19

See also
 Delta Green

References

External links 
 Official Alternity website

Alternity
D20 System
Origins Award winners